Jerzy Klempel (23 April 1953 – 28 May 2004) was a Polish former handball player and coach who competed in the 1976 Summer Olympics and in the 1980 Summer Olympics.

In 1976 he won the bronze medal with the Polish team. He played all five matches and scored 23 goals.

Four years later he was part of the Polish team which finished seventh. He played all six matches and scored 44 goals. He became the top scorer of the tournament.

See also
List of handballers with 1000 or more international goals

External links 
 profile 
 Olympic Profile
 

1953 births
2004 deaths
People from Kłodzko County
Polish male handball players
Polish handball coaches
Handball players at the 1976 Summer Olympics
Handball players at the 1980 Summer Olympics
Olympic handball players of Poland
Olympic bronze medalists for Poland
Frisch Auf Göppingen players
Olympic medalists in handball
Sportspeople from Lower Silesian Voivodeship
Medalists at the 1976 Summer Olympics